This is a list of stars which are more luminous than any closer star, that is, stars which emit more radiation than any other star within the same distance of the Sun. The luminosities are measured in bolometric luminosity and not by visual luminosity. For example, Alpha Centauri A is the most luminous star within 5 light-years of the Sun. In order to find a star more luminous than α Cen, the radius would have to be extended out to 9 light years, to include Sirius.  The closest star more luminous than Sirius is Vega, at 25 light years, and so on.

It is important to note that the most luminous star within the same distance of the sun may not be the most luminous in visual range.  R Doradus emits much less visible light than Achernar, but its high infrared luminosity makes it brighter.

References

See also
 List of most luminous stars
 List of nearest stars
 List of nearest bright stars

Lists of stars
Stars more luminous than any closer star